Nanıc (also, Kanyl’ and Nanuch) is a village in the Ismailli Rayon of Azerbaijan.   The village forms part of the municipality of Müdri.

References 

Populated places in Ismayilli District